Jagielnik may refer to the following places in Poland:

Jagielnik, Lubusz Voivodeship
Jagielnik, West Pomeranian Voivodeship